This is a list of notable events relating to the environment in 1994. They relate to environmental law, conservation, environmentalism and environmental issues.

Events

January
An oil spill occurred when the barge Morris J. Berman grounded off Punta Escambron, San Juan in Puerto Rico. The barge spilled approximately 800,000 gallons of #6 oil on the reef.
The North American Agreement on Environmental Cooperation, an environmental agreement between the United States of America, Canada and Mexico as a side-treaty of the North American Free Trade Agreement (NAFTA), came into effect.

March
The United Nations Framework Convention on Climate Change (UNFCCC) enters into force.

June
The Montréal Process, also known as the Working Group on Criteria and Indicators for the Conservation and Sustainable Management of Temperate and Boreal Forests, was formed in Geneva, Switzerland. It is a voluntary agreement on sustainable forest management.

See also

Human impact on the environment
List of environmental issues